Cawdor is a rural locality in the Toowoomba Region, Queensland, Australia.

History 
The locality takes its name from the former Cawdor railway station, named by the Queensland Railway Department to be named after a character from William Shakespeare's play, Macbeth.

Population 

References 

Toowoomba Region
Localities in Queensland